Semrush Holdings, Inc. is an American public company that offers a SaaS platform known as Semrush. The platform is often used for keyword research and online ranking data, including metrics such as search volume and cost per click (CPC). The platform also collects information about online keywords gathered from Google and Bing search engines. It was released by Boston-based company Semrush Inc, founded by Oleg Shchegolev and Dmitri Melnikov.

As of 2022, the company has 1000+ employees and offices in Barcelona, Belgrade, Berlin, Yerevan, Limassol, Prague, Warsaw, Amsterdam, Austin, Boston, Dallas, Philadelphia, and Trevose.

History
Oleg Shchegolev and Dmitri Melnikov started out as SEO enthusiasts, interested in industry developments and new technologies, and wanted to create a tool to identify market trends and industry best practices.

The software was released as Seodigger before becoming an extension of Firefox, then renamed SeoQuake Company in 2007, before landing on SEMrush. In 2016, the software broke the one million user mark with customers in more than 100 countries.

In April 2018, the company received $40 million in funding as part of a financing transaction co-led by venture capital firms Greycroft, E.ventures and Siguler Guff, in preparation for its expansion into various platforms of research, including those owned by Amazon, Microsoft, and Baidu.

In December 2020, the company rebranded with a new visual identity, updating its name from "SEMrush" to "Semrush".

In March 2021, Semrush had an initial public offering and went public on NYSE under the symbol . The S-1 form revealed that the company had sales of $213 million and more than 82,000 customers.

In June 2022, the company launched a beta tool for content generation called Content Outline Builder. The tool will suggest ideas on article writing and blog posts. SEMrush also announced on June 27, 2022, that their Backlinks insights data is now integrated with SurferSEO, a marketing tool focussed on content creation.

Features 
The key features of the Semrush tool include:

 Google Rank Tracking
 Domain Authority Tracking
 Competitor Analysis
 Backlink Analysis
 Keyword Research
 Site Audits
 Keyword Click Analysis
 Content Explorer
 Semrush Sensor
 Traffic Analytics
 Site Audit

References

Internet search
Online databases
Search engine optimization companies
Internet terminology
Search engine optimization
2008 software
Internet properties established in 2008
2021 initial public offerings
Companies based in Boston
Companies_listed_on_the_New_York_Stock_Exchange